Thirlby is a surname. Notable people with the surname include:

 Jess Thirlby (born 1979), English netball player and coach
 Olivia Thirlby (born 1986), American screen actress
 Rob Thirlby (born 1979), Cornish rugby union footballer
 Thomas Thirlby ( 1500–1570), English bishop